The order of battle proceeded as follows:

See also 
 Peruvian War of Independence

Notes

Spanish American wars of independence orders of battle